Sphenella nigropilosa is a species of tephritid or fruit flies in the genus Sphenella of the family Tephritidae.

Distribution
Indonesia.

References

Tephritinae
Insects described in 1914
Diptera of Asia